The Miles M.46 L.R.5 was a two-seat light aircraft, designed in the United Kingdom, for private and club use in 1944-1945.

Design and development
A small band of enthusiasts at Miles' Liverpool road factory, (L.R.5 - 5th design from Liverpool Road) gained permission from |George Miles]] to design and build a light aircraft for possible production after the end of the Second World War. Miles gave his permission and also agreed to the company supplying any materials required.

The L.R.5 emerged in 1945 as a single-engined, wooden, low-wing monoplane with a fixed tricycle undercarriage, powered by a  Blackburn Cirrus Minor 4-cylinder, air-cooled, inverted, in-line piston aircraft engine. The spacious side-by-side configuration cockpit was covered by a large plexiglas canopy with car-type entry doors on both sides. The undercarriage included levered sprung main legs and a steerable nosewheel.

Due to disappointing flight test results and higher priority given to established production aircraft, development of the L.R.5 was abandoned.

Operational history
George Miles flew the prototype, which had been allocated the experimental registration U-0253 (later U-6), on 3 June 1945, but although flight test results were disappointing at low speeds, on take-off and landing, the L.R.5 was pleasant to fly and had excellent visibility.

Specifications (L.R.5)

See also

Notes

References

External links
Miles M.64 L.R.5
Photo of derelict L.R.5

Miles aircraft
Single-engined tractor aircraft
Low-wing aircraft
Aircraft first flown in 1945